Pan-Icarian Brotherhood is a fraternal society organized on January 26, 1903 by eleven Ikarian men in Verona, Pennsylvania. The Icarian Brotherhood of America (also known as Ikaros) was finalized on July 17, 1905 with the establishment of a chapter from the State of Pennsylvania.

History
Early Ikarians in North America has experienced near in-humane working conditions as they are working for about sixty to seventy hours a week. These workers share sleeping quarters with several others and taking turns to sleep as no enough bed was provided. These has forced early Ikarians in America to help each other and realized the need for brotherhood.

Icarian Brotherhood
On January 26, 1903, eleven men from Pittsburgh namely: Demetrios Vassilaros, Vasilios Triantafillou, John Pamphilis, Stamatis Kratsas, Emmanuel Pamphilis, Nikolaos Vassilaros, Angelo Tsantes, Anastasios Diniacos, John Lardas, Nicholas Paralemos, and John Mavrikes met for the purpose of forming an organization. The Icarian Brotherhood of America was born and the first chapter in Pennsylvania was acquired on July 17, 1905.

The organization's funds were from the dues collected on members per month which are to cover burial expenses, insurance for sick and disabled Ikarians.

The Artemis and Icaros
Ikarian's population in America increased and the brotherhood starts to think to give aid to Icarian people and started to collect funds for different projects. A rivalry and disagreement have developed between the members from northern and southern Icaria as who should benefit from the group's philanthropy. The Northern Icarian members formed the Pan-Ikarian Beneficial Society “Artemis” and was officially chartered in 1910. The Artemis group focused on the construction of a harbor at Evdilos while the Icaros focused in the construction of a school building in Agios Kyrikos Each group held separate activities including the celebration of Ikaria's Independence. The rivalry existed for several years, and efforts were made to unite the two groups. The two rival group finally united in 1916.

The Artemis group was not successful in raising funds, unlike the Icaros who had already raised funds for the school building project. At this time, the Artemis realized the importance of Icaros' school building project and started to contribute. The Artemis has evolved into a private club while the Icaros continued to flourish.

Knights and Ladies of Ikaria
In 1922, the American Hellenic Educational Progressive Association (AHEPA) was organized. Vasilios Isidoros Chebithes used his public relations skills and establish AHEPA chapters evolving the organization into the largest Hellenic organization in the United States. The non-provision of establishing a chapter in the by-laws of the Icarian Brotherhood of America, the brotherhood have not formed any chapter outside Allegheny County. Chebithes bypass this and created the  Knights and Ladies of Icaria (KALOI) with the Icarians of Akron, Ohio in 1931.

Pan-Icarian Brotherhood of America
Finally in 1934, a meeting of KALOI, Icaros and Artemis were held to create a united Icarian organization. With the merging of KALOI chapters and the Icarian Brotherhood, Pan-Icarian Brotherhood of America was established.

Pan-Ikarian Brotherhood of Australia "Ikaros" Inc.
In 1958, a Pan-Ikarian Brotherhood was founded in Adelaide, South Australia, modelled after their American counterparts. In 1986 the Brotherhood purchased a hall at Arthur Street, Unley, where they continue to operate today. There is also an Ikarian brotherhood based in Sydney, New South Wales.

Structure
The brotherhood's structure is similar to the American Hellenic Educational Progressive Association and other American fraternal organizations in which dues are paid by members and the organization was governed by a national governing body as elected. The membership was open to all Ikarians  and Fournians (neighboring island) as per the brotherhoods constitution.

Chapters
The brotherhood now has 28 active chapters:

Pramne - Youngstown, Ohio
Pandiki - New York, New York
Spanos/Areti - Detroit, Michigan
Oinoe - Southern California
Helios - Clearwater, Florida
Langada - Atlanta, Georgia
Irini - Norfolk, Virginia
V.I. Chebithes - Akron, Ohio
Doliche - Steubenville, Ohio
Therma - Wilmington, North Carolina
Nea Ikaria - Port Jefferson, New York
Kavo-Papas - Houston, Texas
Drakanon - Parma, Ohio
Aetheras Summit SW - Denver, Colorado
Pharos - Cleveland, Ohio
Icaros - Pittsburgh, Pennsylvania
Lynchos - Northern California
Lefkas - Washington - Baltimore
Nisos Ikaria - Toronto, Ontario
N'Ikaria - Northwest Indiana
Pan-Icarian Brotherhood of Australia
Daedalos - Warren, Ohio
Foutrides - Chicago, Illinois
Atheras - Philadelphia, Pennsylvania
Christ E. Aivaliotis - Columbus, Ohio
Ikaros of Montreal - Montreal, Quebec
Panagia - Upstate, New York
Pan-Icarian Brotherhood Youth

Pan-Icarian Foundation
The Pan-Icarian Foundation was the charitable arm of the Pan-Icarian Brotherhood that administers the philanthropic endeavors of the organization.

References

Fraternal orders
Greek-American history
Ethnic fraternal orders in the United States